Arhopala alesia, the pallid oakblue, (sometimes in Amblypodia) is a small butterfly found in India that belongs to the lycaenids or blues family.

Description
The forewing length is about 18mm.

Subspecies
At least 5 subspecies are listed:
 A. a. alesia
 A. a. wimberleyi (de Nicéville, 1887)
 A. a. sacharja Fruhstorfer, 1914
 A. a. mio (Hayashi, 1981)
 A. a. soloni M. & T. Okano, 1995

Range
The butterfly occurs in India in the Andamans and from Dawnas to southern Myanmar.

The nominotypical subspecies is distributed on Bohol, Luzon, Marinduque, Mindoro, Mindanao & Tawitawi Islands.  The subspecies soloni is on Leyte Island. The subspecies mio is found on Negros Island.

Status
William Harry Evans described the species as rare in 1932.

See also
List of butterflies of India (Lycaenidae)

Cited references

References
 
 
 
 Treadaway, Colin G., 1955: "Checklist of the butterflies of the Philippine Islands". Nachrichten des Entomologischen Vereins Apollo, Suppl. 14: 7–118.
 Treadaway, Colin G. & Schrőder, Heinz G., 2012: "Revised checklist of the butterflies of the Philippine Islands (Lepidoptera: Rhopalocera)". Nachrichten des Entomologischen Vereins Apollo, Suppl. 20: 1-64.
 

Arhopala
Butterflies of Asia